The 1963 South Pacific Games was the first edition of the tournament and was held in Fiji from 29 August to 7 September.

Participants

 Papua New Guinea

Matches

First round

Semi-finals

Third place play-off

Final

Sources
Results on RSSSF

1963
Football at the Pacific Games
P
Pac
1963 Pacific Games